The 1936 Iowa Hawkeyes football team represented the University of Iowa in the 1936 college football season. This was Ossie Solem's fifth and final season as head coach of the Hawkeyes.

Schedule

References

Iowa
Iowa Hawkeyes football seasons
Iowa Hawkeyes football